Rhynchostylis gigantea is a species of orchid. This species was first described in 1896 by John Lindley and is native to Borneo, Myanmar, Thailand, Peninsular Malaysia, Laos, Cambodia, Vietnam, China (Hainan) and the Philippines.

Rhynchostylis differs from Vanda by the one-lobed lip. The inflorescences appear in autumn and winter. Due to the wide distribution of Rhynchostylis gigantea, there is a range of different clones: flowers vary slightly in shape and colour (from white to dark red, with spotted forms).

Unlike Vanda species, they need indirect light. Rhynchostylis gigantea are best grown in a wood-slat basket with little or no potting material and will grow massive fleshy roots entangled throughout the basket if given uniform water and fertilizer. The plants are warm- to hot-growing. it is the state flower of the Indian state of Assam where it is known as kopouful (কপৌফুল) in Assamese.

References

External links

gigantea
Orchids of Borneo
Orchids of Myanmar
Orchids of Cambodia
Orchids of China
Orchids of Laos
Orchids of Malaysia
Orchids of Thailand
Orchids of the Philippines
Orchids of Vietnam
Flora of Hainan
Plants described in 1833
Symbols of Assam